Bagassi  is a department or commune of Balé Province in southern Burkina Faso. Its capital is the town of Bagassi. According to the 2019 census the department had a population of 42,402.

Towns and villages
Towns and villages and populations in the department are as follows:

References

Departments of Burkina Faso
Balé Province